The Bach Ice Shelf is an ice shelf which is irregular in shape and  in extent, occupying an embayment in the south part of Alexander Island entered between Berlioz Point and Rossini Point. The ice shelf supports the south face of the Beethoven Peninsula, along with some minor extensive peninsulas and small inlets (Weber Inlet, Boccherini Inlet etc.) Bach ice shelf also supports the north side of the Monteverdi Peninsula. A minor embayment in this position first appeared on the charts of the US Antarctic Service, which explored the south part of Alexander Island by air and from the ground in 1940. The ice shelf was delineated by Derek J.H. Searle of the Falkland Islands Dependencies Survey in 1960, from air photos obtained by the Ronne Antarctic Research Expedition in 1947–48. It was named by the UK Antarctic Place-Names Committee after the German composer Johann Sebastian Bach.

In a 2009 review, the Bach Ice Shelf was listed as one of 5 Antarctic peninsula Ice shelves that were not retreating. However, with the retreat of the Wilkins Ice Shelf possibly signalling a southward retreat of the limit of viability, Bach Ice Shelf may be the next to come under threat.

Further reading 
 A. J. Cook and D. G. Vaughan, Overview of areal changes of the ice shelves on the Antarctic Peninsula over the past 50 years, The Cryosphere Discuss., 3, 579–630, 2009 www.the-cryosphere-discuss.net/3/579/2009/
 M. P. Schodlok, D. Menemenlis, E. J. Rignot, Ice shelf basal melt rates around Antarctica from simulations and observations,  https://doi.org/10.1002/2015JC011117 
 Laurie Padman, Daniel P. Costa, Michael S. Dinniman, Helen A. Fricker, Michael E. Goebel, Luis A. Huckstadt, Angelika Humbert, Ian Joughin, Jan T. M. Lenaerts, Stefan R. M. Ligtenberg,  Ted Scambos  Michiel R. van den Broeke, Oceanic controls on the mass balance of Wilkins Ice Shelf, Antarctica,  https://doi.org/10.1029/2011JC007301
 C S M Doake, H F J Corr, A Jenkins, K W Nicholls and C Stewart, Interpretation of polarimetric ice penetrating radar data over Antarctic ice shelves,  FRISP Report No. 14 (2003)

External links 

 Bach Ice Shelf on USGS website 
 Bach Ice Shelf on AADC website
 Bach Ice Shelf on SCAR website

References 

 

Ice shelves of Antarctica
Bodies of ice of Alexander Island